Soulfly is an American heavy metal band from Phoenix, Arizona. Formed by vocalist and rhythm guitarist Max Cavalera following his departure from Sepultura in 1997, the group originally included lead guitarist Jackson Bandeira, bassist Marcelo "Cello" Dias and drummer Roy "Rata" Mayorga. Bandeira left after the recording of the band's self-titled debut album, with former Machine Head guitarist Logan Mader taking his place in April 1998 for the album's touring cycle. Mader had left by the following January, with Mikey Doling joining in his place. Mayorga departed the group in July 1999, with Joe Nunez announced as his replacement in November. Nunez performed on the 2000 album Primitive, but left the following October due to concerns with his "financial arrangement with the group". Mayorga returned in his place.

In September 2003, Dias was fired from Soulfly by Cavalera and his wife Gloria (the band's manager), which prompted Doling and Mayorga to leave. The departed members were quickly replaced by returning drummer Nunez, Primer 55 guitarist Bobby Burns on bass, and former Ill Niño guitarist Marc Rizzo. The group's lineup subsequently remained stable for a number of years, before Burns left in July 2010, shortly after the release of Omen. Fireball Ministry's Johny Chow filled in for a string of tour dates, before Tony Campos (formerly of Static-X) joined as Burns' full-time replacement in 2011. Shortly after Campos' addition, Nunez left Soulfly and was replaced temporarily by Cavalera's son Zyon. Borknagar's David Kinkade subsequently joined in September, performing on the group's eighth studio album Enslaved.

Kinkade played his final show with Soulfly on October 23, 2012, when he decided to retire from music. Zyon Cavalera subsequently returned to the band in Kinkade's place. In May 2015, Campos left Soulfly to join Fear Factory, with Havok's Mike Leon taking over a few months later.

Members

Current

Former

Touring

Timeline

Lineups

References

External links
Soulfly official website

Soulfly